Helvetic Clinics is a Switzerland-based company that owns dental clinics of the same name in Hungary, Switzerland, Luxembourg.

History 
Helvetic clinics, Hungary branch, comprises a team of ten certified dentists with expertise in the field and 100 supporting staff. The clinic focuses on dental treatments such as implants, surgery, general and cosmetic dentistry among others.

Helvetic clinic is rated 4.67 by The GCR- Global Clinic Rating, the first position worldwide and in Hungary out of almost 200,000+ dental clinics worldwide. This is largely a result of the owners' decision to move the clinic into a hotel on Revay street, in the centre of Budapest to house the new facilities. The clinic developed the new concept of a "Clinic Hotel" offering its patients traveling from abroad; dental treatment and accommodation in the same facilities as it is sharing the facilities with the 12 Revay Hotel.

Helvetic clinics targets individuals mainly within Europe's developed countries and with a claim of dental treatments 30–80% cheaper from those of its clients' home countries.

References 

Clinics
Health care companies of Switzerland